The 2016 Derry Senior Hurling Championship was the 71st edition of the Derry GAA's premier hurling tournament for senior clubs in Derry club hurling competitions. The winners receive the Fr Collins Cup.

Slaughtneil Robert Emmet's were the defending champions, having beaten Swatragh 5–26 to 1–5 in the 2015 final. They won their fourth championship in a row by beating Bangher 2–19 to 1–12 in the final on 11 September 2016.

Quarter-finals

Semi-finals

Final

Ulster Senior Club Hurling Championship

References

2016 senior hurling county championships
Derry Senior Hurling Championship